Municipal elections took place in Iceland on 26 May 2018. 55 of the 72 municipal councils in the country were elected using open list PR. The rural municipality Tjörneshreppur did not hold an election as only one list was presented, whose candidates were thereby automatically elected. No list was presented in 16 municipalities. Municipal councils in those municipalities were elected using a form of plurality block voting were voters write in the names of their preferred candidates. Two of the municipal councils were for new municipalities created after mergers.

Results

References

2018
2018 elections in Europe
2018 in Iceland
May 2018 events in Europe